Amina Yuguda is a Nigerian journalist from Yola, Adamawa state and news presenter with local network Gotel Television. She focuses on profiling high stories on Northern Nigeria especially around the Boko Haram insurgency. She has won the 2019 BBC World News Komla Dumor Award.

She currently works at the American University of Nigeria as an Assistant Director in the office of the Vice President for University Relations.

Yuguda produced a mini-documentary series called The Real Africa.

References 

Living people

Year of birth missing (living people)